Flight 111 may refer to:
Swissair Flight 111, crashed on 2 September 1998 near Peggys Cove, Nova Scotia, killing 229
Allied Air Flight 111, crashed on 2 June 2012 in Accra, Ghana, killing 10
Școala Superioară de Aviație Civilă Flight 111 crashed in the Apuseni Mountains, Romania, killing 2

0111